Durango is a city in Dubuque County, Iowa, United States. It is part of the Dubuque, Iowa Metropolitan Statistical Area. The population was 20 at the time of the 2020 census, down from 24 in 2000.

Geography
Durango is located at  (42.560063, -90.775907).

Demographics

2010 census
As of the census of 2010, there were 22 people, 10 households, and 6 families living in the city. The racial makeup of the city was 100.0% White.

Of the 10 households, 20.0% had children under the age of 18 living with them, 60.0% were married couples living together, and 40.0% were non-families. 40.0% of households were one person, and 20% were one person aged 65 or older. The average household size was 2.20 and the average family size was 3.00.

The median age was 46 years. 18.2% of residents were under the age of 18; 13.5% were between the ages of 18 and 24; 13.5% were from 25 to 44; 27.2% were from 45 to 64; and 27.3% were 65 or older. The gender makeup of the city was 63.6% male and 36.4% female.

2000 census
As of the census of 2000, there were 24 people, 11 households, and 7 families living in the city. The racial makeup of the city was 100.00% White.

Of the 11 households 36.4% (4) had children under the age of 18 living with them, 45.5% (5) were married couples living together, 27.3% (3) had a female householder with no husband present, and 27.3% (3) were non-families. 27.3% (3) of all households were made up of individuals, and 18.2% (2) had someone living alone who was 65 or older. The average household size was 2.18 and the average family size was 2.50.

The age distribution was 20.8% (5) under the age of 18, 8.3% (2) from 18 to 24, 33.3% (8) from 25 to 44, 20.8% (5) from 45 to 64, and 16.7% (4) who were 65 or older. The median age was 39 years. For every 100 females, there were 71.4 males (There were 14 females and 10 males). For every 100 females age 18 and over, there were 72.7 males (That makes 10 females and 7 males).

The median household income was $32,188 and the median income for a family was $55,625. Males had a median income of $0 versus $22,083 for females. The per capita income for the city was $19,827. There were 22.2% of families living below the poverty line and 15.4% of the population, including 50.0% of under eighteens and none of those over 64.

References

Cities in Iowa
Cities in Dubuque County, Iowa